Tractatus coislinianus is an ancient Greek manuscript outlining a theory of comedy in the tradition of Aristotle's Poetics.

Dramatic theory
The Tractatus states that comedy invokes laughter and pleasure, thus purging those emotions (catharsis), in a manner parallel to the description of tragedy in the Poetics. It proceeds to describe the devices used and manner in which catharsis is brought about.

History
The manuscript now resides in Paris, France, at the Bibliothèque Nationale; it is labeled "Coislinianus 120". The 10th-century manuscript resided at Great Lavra on Mount Athos. In 1643, Athanasius Rhetor sent it from Cyprus to Séguier de Coislin. The classicist J. A. Cramer, poring through the collection of Henri Charles du Cambout de Coislin, was struck by the content, believing it to be the work of a commentator on Aristotle's theory of comedy, and published it in 1839. This belief was soon derided, but it has gained force in the 20th century; Richard Janko has argued that it is the notes or sketches of the lost second section of the Poetics. Nesselrath argues that it is a later work, perhaps by Theophrastus.

Sources
 Janko, Richard, trans. 1987. Poetics with Tractatus Coislinianus, Reconstruction of Poetics II and the Fragments of the On Poets. By Aristotle. Cambridge: Hackett. .
 Nesselrath, Heinz-Günther. 1990. Die attische mittlere Komödie: ihre Stellung in der antiken Literaturkritik und Literaturgeschichte. Untersuchungen zur antiken Literatur und Geschichte vol. 36. Berlin: Walter de Gruyter. .

Further reading
 Watson, Walter, 2012. The Lost Second Book of Aristotle's 'Poetics'. Chicago : University of Chicago Press. .

External links
 Lane Cooper, 

Ancient Greek theatre
Ancient Greek works
Works about Aristotle
Books of literary criticism
Books about literary theory
10th-century books
Works about theatre
Treatises